Tunisia, participated at the 1987 All-Africa Games held in Nairobi, Kenya. She won 76 medals.

Medal summary

Medal table

See also
 Tunisia at the All-Africa Games

References

Nations at the 1987 All-Africa Games
1987
1987 in Tunisian sport